Nanny Mountain is a mountain summit in York County in the state of South Carolina (SC). The mountain is located near Lake Wylie and was privately owned, but now it is currently open to the public from 8am to 6pm and the park is owned and operated by York County Parks.

References

External links 
Nanny Mountain Summit - South Carolina Mountain Peak Information

Mountains of South Carolina
Landforms of York County, South Carolina
Protected areas of York County, South Carolina
Inselbergs of Piedmont (United States)